Sitochroa dasconalis is a moth in the family Crambidae. It was described by Francis Walker in 1859. It is found in North America, where it has been recorded from Massachusetts to Illinois, south to Florida and then west to Texas.

The forewings are whitish with yellow at the base and along the costa. The hindwings are white. Adults have been recorded on wing from April to July.

The larvae feed on Baptisia tinctoria.

References

Moths described in 1859
Pyraustinae